Isaac Chester Cooper is a Bahamian Progressive Liberal Party politician serving as Deputy Prime Minister of the Bahamas to Philip Davis and Minister of Tourism and Aviation since September 2021. He has been the Member of Parliament (MP) for The Exumas and Ragged Island since 2017.

Early life
Cooper was born and raised in Forbes Hill, Little Exuma, the youngest of 12 children to the Reverends Eulon and Louise Cooper. His father passed away when he was 5. He graduated with a Master of Business Administration in Accounting and Finance from Nova Southeastern University in 1995.

Career
Before going into politics, Cooper worked in finance. He became the Chairman and CEO of BAF Global Group and President and CEO of BAF Financial & Insurance Ltd.

In November 2016, Cooper was ratified as the PLP candidate for the Exumas and Ragged Island in the 2017 general election. He was one of four PLP candidates to win or retain their seat that election. Whilst in Opposition, he became Deputy Leader of the PLP to Leader Philip Davis. As the PLP won the 2021 general election, it was confirmed Cooper would remain in his post and was sworn in as Deputy Prime Minister. He was also appointed Minister of Tourism, Investment, and Aviation.

Personal life
He is married to Cecillia; they have three children. He selects a charity a year to donate his MP salary to.

References

External links
PLP profile

Living people
Deputy Prime Ministers of the Bahamas
Members of the House of Assembly of the Bahamas
Nova Southeastern University alumni
People from Exuma
Progressive Liberal Party politicians
21st-century Bahamian politicians
1964 births